Lietuvos moksleivių krepšinio lyga (MKL) (English: Lithuanian Pupils Basketball League) is the Lithuanian boys' and girls' pupils basketball league. The league is divided into 12 age-based categories, starting from Under-12 (First Challenge) and ending with Under-19 (Olympic Cup). Chocolate bars producer Manija is the general sponsor of the league.

Schools ranking

TOP 10 boy's schools 

Last updated: 2015-08-17.

TOP 10 girl's schools 

Last updated: 2015-08-17.

External links 
Official MKL website
Official MKL Facebook page

References 

Basketball leagues in Lithuania